Baranoski is a surname. Notable people with the surname include:

Edward Baranoski, American engineer
Matthew Baranoski (born 1993), American professional racing cyclist

See also
Barański
Baranowski